Monégasque (munegascu, ;) is the variety of Ligurian spoken in Monaco. It is closely related to the Ligurian dialects spoken in Ventimiglia and is considered a national language of Monaco, though it is not the official language of the country, which is French. Monégasque has been officially taught in the schools of Monaco since 1972 and was made a compulsory subject in 1976, but is the native language of only a handful of people.

History 
In 1191, the Republic of Genoa took possession of Monaco and began settling in 1215. These Genoese settlers brought their vernacular language with them which would develop into Monégasque. Prior to the Genoese settlers, the main language of the region was Provençal, as spoken in the nearby localities of Menton and Roquebrune. By 1355, Menton, Roquebrune, and Monaco were under the political union of the Grimaldis, but despite this, there was a linguistic divide as the primary language of Monaco was Ligurian. Overtime Monégasque began to split from the Genoese vernacular as Monaco came under the political influence of foreign powers, namely taking influences from French and Italian, but also briefly from Spanish and Catalan as Monaco had been under Spanish occupation for over a hundred years, ending in 1641.

Afterwards, Monaco would be under French protection and prior to the French Revolution, Italian and Monégasque were the primary languages of the political elite, administration, clergy and natives. French would however begin to become a major influence as France instituted bilingual government. At this time the population of Monaco was mainly made up of immigrants and descendants from Genoa and other parts Liguria, and though Monégasque was not written, it was openly spoken and passed down through families by oral tradition. People coming in from the Italian city-states were considered closer neighbors than those coming in from Grimaldi-led cities of Menton and Roquebrune, who were considered foreigners despite their union with Monaco.

In 1793, Monaco was annexed by France and by 1805, decrees from the Emperor of France, imposed French language instruction and limited the use of other languages. The Grimaldis reestablished a sovereign principality in 1814, but maintained French as the only official language though Italian and Monégasque remained national languages. In 1815, Prince Honoré IV decreed French and Italian equal status in education, though Italian gradually declined as the nearby regions became more French, noticeably in 1860 with the French annexation of Nice. Monégasque was then demoted to a "patois," and barred from being taught or spoken in public and religious schools until 1976, in a similar manner to that of Occitan in France. 

By 1924, Monégasque was close to extinction if not for the efforts of the National Committee of Monégasque Traditions (Cumitau Naçiunale d'ë Tradiçiune Munegasche). In 1927, Louis Notari published the A Legenda de Santa Devota, the first literary work in Monégasque. This was soon followed by all kinds of literature, such as poetry, stories, and theatre being written in Monégasque attracting more attention to the language. In 1972, the first class in Monégasque was taught by clergymen, Georges Franzi, with support from the Félibrige, an Occitan language association, and by 1976, Monégasque was made a compulsory subject in public and private primary education thanks to an initiative by the government. This was later expanded in 1979 and 1989 to make it a compulsory subject in secondary education and as an optional subject for the baccalaureate. In 1982, Prince Rainier III created a sovereign ordinance that established the Commission for the Monégasque Language, which is responsible for the education and study of the language.

Classification 
Monégasque shares many features with the Genoese dialect and is closely related the dialect of Ventimiglia. Despite earlier attempts to link it to Occitan, Monégasque is a Ligurian dialect with Occitan contributions while the nearby Menton dialect is an Occitan dialect with Ligurian features.

Monégasque, like all other Ligurian language variants, is derived directly from the Vulgar Latin of what is now northwestern Italy and southeastern France and has some influence in vocabulary, morphology and syntax from French and related Gallo-Romance languages, but most words are more like Italian.

Before the annexation of the County of Nice to France in 1860, the Niçois spoke a dialect very similar to Monégasque.

Speakers 
The sole official language of Monaco is French as stated in their Constitution with Monégasque being used informally. As Monégasques are only a minority in Monaco, the language was threatened with extinction in the 1970s. In a nation with other 130 different nationalities, Monégasque struggles in a time of globalization. Despite being compulsory in education, it's not common for students in Monaco to use it outside the classroom or to take their baccalaureates in the Monégasque option. Adult education and lessons to foreign residents are carried out, and yearly there is language competition for schoolchildren that is presided by the Prince.

Literature 
Monégasque was not a written language until 1927, beginning with Louis Notari’s A Legenda de Santa Devota. Prior to that, any semblance of written Monégasque was usually referred to as Ligurian, Genoese, Italian, and sometimes even French.

Other authors in Monégasque also include:

 Louis Barral, curator of the Museum of Prehistoric Anthropology, lexicographer of the Monégasque dictionary, and author of science and fiction.
 , co-author the dictionary with Barral.
 Robert Boisson, founder of the Academy of Dialectal Languages and poet of works such as Vibrations intérieures – Harmonies Humaines.
 Louis Frolla, clergyman and grammatician the grammar of Monégasque.
  teacher of  Monégasque via sermons and activist for education in Monégasque.
 , actor, artist, and author of plays in Monégasque.
 Jules Soccal, sailor and author of Le Vocabulaire monégasque de la marine et de la mer, a description Monégasque sea jargon.

Orthography 
The Monégasque alphabet is made up of 23 letters and the orthography generally follows Italian principles, with a few unique graphemes and features borrowed from French:

Notes:

 Similar to Italian hard and soft C. /k/ before a, o, u, ü, and ch.
 Similar to Italian hard and soft G.  before e and i.
 H is used like it is in Italian, after C and G for Ch /k/ and Gh /g/.
 Pronounced as in French, although it may be intervolalic.
 /ʃ/ before t, s, and p. /z/ in between vowels.
 /ʃ/ before e or i.

Grammar

Samples
Below is an excerpt from the Monégasque national anthem, written by Louis Notari. In addition, there is an older French version of the anthem; its lyrics have a different meaning. The choice between the two forms is generally subject to the occasion and the circumstance.

The following is a Monégasque rendering of the Hail Mary:

See also 
 Languages of Monaco
 Languages of Europe
 Languages of Italy

References

External links  
 Poems read in Monegasque
 Grammaire Monégasque
 National Committee of Monégasque Traditions
 Dictionnaire Français - Monégasque

Ligurian language (Romance)
Languages of Monaco
Monegasque culture
Endangered Romance languages
City colloquials